Amanbaev (former name: Groznoye) is a village in the Talas Region of Kyrgyzstan. It is part of the Kara-Buura District. Its population was 6,635 in 2021. It is located on the country north-west border with the Jambyl Region of Kazakhstan.

Population

References

Populated places in Talas Region